Gastone Darè (18 February 1918 – 7 June 1976) was an Italian fencer and politician. He won two silver medals in the team sabre events at the 1948 and 1952 Summer Olympics. He was elected to the Italian Senate for the Socialist Party in 1963 and 1968.

References

External links
Site

1918 births
1976 deaths
Italian male fencers
Olympic fencers of Italy
Italian Socialist Party politicians
Members of the Senate of the Republic (Italy)
Fencers at the 1948 Summer Olympics
Fencers at the 1952 Summer Olympics
Fencers at the 1956 Summer Olympics
Olympic silver medalists for Italy
People from Suzzara
Olympic medalists in fencing
Medalists at the 1948 Summer Olympics
Medalists at the 1952 Summer Olympics
Members of the Italian Senate from Lombardy
Sportspeople from the Province of Mantua
Politicians from the Province of Mantua